Relief is an unincorporated community in Mitchell County, North Carolina, United States. The community is located along the banks of the North Toe River, connected to North Carolina Highway 197 (NC 197) via Relief Road (SR 1314).

History
In 1870, the Squire Peterson’s Store sold a patent medicine called Hart's Relief, in which the principal ingredient was alcohol; patrons enjoyed the “relief” it provided. In 1888, the Relief Post Office was established; during its tenure it assumed mail service from nearby Poplar (1949), Street (1917), and Tipton Hill (1951). In 1974 the post office was closed and replaced with rural letter carrier service from Green Mountain.

References

Unincorporated communities in Mitchell County, North Carolina
Unincorporated communities in North Carolina